Bruno Adriel Valdez (born 4 January 2002) is an Argentine professional footballer who plays as a centre-back for Estudiantes.

Club career
Valdez signed with the academy of Estudiantes in 2015, penning terms from hometown club Huracán. After progressing through their youth system for the next number of years, he was promoted into their first-team squad in February 2021; making his unofficial bow in a friendly match against Arsenal de Sarandí on 3 February. On 14 February, Valdez made his competitive senior debut during a Copa de la Liga Profesional encounter at home to River Plate, after coming off the bench to replace Martín Cauteruccio at the interval.

International career
In 2017, Valdez appeared for Argentina at the South American U-15 Championship in Brazil; a competition they won under the guidance of Diego Placente. In 2019, Valdez was selected on the preliminary squad list by Pablo Aimar for the FIFA U-17 World Cup - though didn't make the final cut.

Style of play
Valdez is primarily a centre-back, though is capable of playing as a midfielder; he also holds experience as an attacking midfielder and as a forward from the early parts of his youth career.

Career statistics
.

Notes

Honours
Argentina U15
South American U-15 Championship: 2017

References

External links

2002 births
Living people
Sportspeople from Mendoza Province
Argentine footballers
Argentina youth international footballers
Association football defenders
Argentine Primera División players
Estudiantes de La Plata footballers